Thomas Pelham may refer to:

Sir Thomas Pelham, 1st Baronet (c. 1540–1624), Member of Parliament for Lewes, Surrey, and Sussex
Sir Thomas Pelham, 2nd Baronet (1597–c. 1654), Member of Parliament for East Grinstead and Sussex
Thomas Pelham, 1st Baron Pelham (1653–1712), English Whig politician
Thomas Pelham (of Lewes, senior) (c. 1678–1759), Member of Parliament for Lewes
Thomas Pelham-Holles, 1st Duke of Newcastle (1693–1768)
Thomas Pelham (of Stanmer) (c. 1705–1737), Turkey merchant, Member of Parliament for Lewes
Thomas Pelham (of Lewes, junior) (c. 1705–1743), Member of Parliament for Hastings and Lewes
Thomas Pelham, 1st Earl of Chichester (1728–1805), British Whig politician
Thomas Pelham, 2nd Earl of Chichester (1756–1826), British Whig politician
 Lord Thomas Henry William Pelham (1847–1916), who was involved in the early boys' clubs movement, see 1871–72 FA Cup

See also
Thomas Pelham-Clinton, 3rd Duke of Newcastle-under-Lyne (1752–1795)